PP-34 Gujrat-VII is a Constituency of Provincial Assembly of Punjab.

General elections 2018

Chaudhry Pervaiz Elahi is the won this constituency. General elections were held on 25 July 2018.

General elections 2013
General election 2013: PP-110 Gujrat-III

General elections 2008

See also
 PP-33 Gujrat-VI
 PP-35 Sialkot-I

References

Provincial constituencies of Punjab, Pakistan